The Young Chefs is a Canadian children's television series on food preparation which originally aired on CBC Television in late 1976.

Premise
Jehane Benoît hosted this series at her family's sheep farm, Noirmouton, near Sutton, Quebec. She was joined by Lisa Schwartz and Karim Kovacevic, the "young chefs" who learned various aspects of food and its preparation.

Scheduling
This half-hour series was broadcast on Wednesdays from 6 October to 29 December 1976 at 5:00 p.m. It was repeated in late 1977 and mid-1978.

References

External links
 

CBC Television original programming
1976 Canadian television series debuts
1976 Canadian television series endings
1970s Canadian children's television series
1970s Canadian cooking television series